Neelam Setti Laxmi (born ) is an Indian female weightlifter, competing in the 69 kg category and representing India at international competitions. She competed at world championships, most recently at the 1999 World Weightlifting Championships. She also won two silver medals at the 2002 Commonwealth Games.

Major results

References

1973 births
Living people
Indian female weightlifters
Place of birth missing (living people)
Weightlifters at the 1994 Asian Games
Medalists at the 1994 Asian Games
Asian Games bronze medalists for India
Asian Games medalists in weightlifting
World Weightlifting Championships medalists
20th-century Indian women
20th-century Indian people
Weightlifters at the 2002 Commonwealth Games
Commonwealth Games medallists in weightlifting
Commonwealth Games silver medallists for India
Medallists at the 2002 Commonwealth Games